Human Diversity: The Biology of Gender, Race, and Class is a 2020 non-fiction book written by the American political scientist Charles Murray. In the book, Murray argues against the orthodoxy within the social sciences — that race is a social construct, gender is a social construct, and class is a function of privilege.

Contents 
In the introduction of the book, Murray lays down ten propositions, that he defends throughout the book:

 Sex differences in personality are consistent worldwide and tend to widen in more gender-egalitarian cultures.
 On average, females worldwide have advantages in verbal ability and social cognition, while males have advantages in visuospatial abilities and the extremes of mathematical ability.
On average, women worldwide are more attracted to vocations centered on people and men to vocations centered on things.
Many sex differences in the brain are coordinate with sex differences in personality, abilities, and social behavior.
Human populations are genetically distinctive in ways that correspond to self-identified race and ethnicity.
Evolutionary selection pressure since humans left Africa has been extensive and mostly local.
Continental population differences in variants associated with personality, abilities, and social behavior are common.
The shared environment usually plays a minor role in explaining personality, abilities, and social behavior.
Class structure is importantly based on differences in abilities that have a substantial genetic component.
Outside interventions are inherently constrained in the effects they can have on personality, abilities, and social behavior.

Murray says, "the empirical record is solid" for the propositions stated above.

In "Part 1" of the book, Murray gives an overview of "the most important developments" in "the state of knowledge about the observable differences in men and women [that have] advanced enormously in the last 20 years."

In "Part 2" of the book, Murray "sets out to convince you that the orthodoxy about race [that it is a social construct] is scientifically obsolete."

In "Part 3" of the book, Murray attacks the thesis that "class is a function of privilege"; to attack this thesis, Murray attempts to establish the heritability of cognitive ability and show that cognitive ability leads to success. Murray also discusses ways to lessen the effects of genes in determining success.

In "Part 4", the final part of the book, Murray concludes by saying that his findings can be reduced to three simple points:

 Human beings can be biologically classified into groups by sex and by ancestral population. Like most biological classifications, these groups have fuzzy edges. This complicates things analytically, but no more than that.
 Many phenotypic differences in personality, abilities, and social behavior that we observe between the sexes, among ancestral populations, and among social classes, have a biological component.
 Growing knowledge about human diversity will inevitably shape the future of the social sciences.

Reception

Positive reviews 
Douglas K. Detterman gave a positive review of the book in the journal Intelligence. Detterman agrees with Murray, and hopes "that there will be relatively little negative reaction to Human Diversity."

Psychologist Russell T. Warne, reviewing the book in the American Journal of Psychology, said that Murray's claims were "a rehash" that would be unsurprising to experts, citing as examples writing by Gottfredson, Neisser, and himself. Warne speculated that Murray's ideas would be rejected due to social scientists' political bias against genetic explanations for social differences.

In the National Review, Robert VerBruggen praised the book while criticizing Murray for ignoring the role of environment.

Negative reviews 
In The New York Times, Murray's book was reviewed negatively by literary critic, Parul Sehgal. Sehgal criticizes Murray for not addressing the role of the environment further, ignoring information in genetics that might weaken his arguments, ignoring information contradicting his views on gender, and inconsistencies. As an example of Murray ignoring contradictory information, she cites a well-known study from Yale to show that sexism is the culprit as to why women have not branched into more male dominated fields, rather than differences between the sexes.

Science writer Philip Ball, reviewing the book for New Statesman, criticized the book for Murray's misplaced confidence in the alleged differences between male and female brains. Ball also says that Murray's claim that there is a natural predominance of men in STEM "is deluded" because it flies in the face of "masses of evidence" that women face discrimination in the sciences. Ball also criticizes Murray's discussion of race because he tries to redefine it as a "cluster of SNP variants". Ball points out that not only are SNP clusters silent on behavioural differences, but also that these clusters can be applied at all levels — between traditional populations of different cities, for example.

Writing for The New Republic, Alex Shephard described Human Diversity as an example of the "juggernaut" of conservative publishing. According to Shephard, claims of cancel culture and political correctness were used by the publisher Twelve (a division of Hachette) as a justification for publishing Murray, despite his "lack of scientific credentials and a penchant for relying on dubious sources".

References 

2020 non-fiction books
American non-fiction books
Books by Charles Murray